The Oyster Run is a motorcycle rally held annually each September since 1981 in Anacortes, Washington. It is the largest rally in the Pacific Northwest with 2006 attendance estimated in the tens of thousands.

There was no rally in 2020 or 2021 due to the pandemic.

References

Festivals in the Puget Sound region
Motorcycle rallies in the United States
Tourist attractions in Skagit County, Washington
Anacortes, Washington